Jerry C. "J. J." Davis (born October 25, 1978) is a former Major League Baseball outfielder. He played during four seasons at the major league level for the Pittsburgh Pirates and Washington Nationals. He was drafted by the Pirates in the 1st round (8th pick) of the 1997 Major League Baseball Draft.
Davis attended Baldwin Park High school.

External links
"J.J. Davis Statistics". The Baseball Cube. 7 January 2008.
"J.J. Davis Statistics". Baseball-Reference. 7 January 2008.

Baseball players from California
Major League Baseball outfielders
1978 births
Living people
Pittsburgh Pirates players
Washington Nationals players
People from Glendora, California
Sportspeople from Los Angeles County, California
Gulf Coast Pirates players
Erie SeaWolves players
Augusta GreenJackets players
Hickory Crawdads players
Lynchburg Hillcats players
Altoona Curve players
Nashville Sounds players
Colorado Springs Sky Sox players
New Orleans Zephyrs players